Joseph Paneagaden was a film actor and film producer in Malayalam.

Personal life 
Joseph was born to Antony and Rosa at Paneagaden House in Parappur, Thrissur district, Kerala, India. Reeja Joseph is his wife. Clinton Joseph and Hinda Maria are children.

Filmography

Acting
Chaithanyam (Malayalam – 1995)
Sparsham (Malayalam – 1999)
Bhagavathipuram (Malayalam – 2011)
Santhithen Unnai  (Tamil – 2013)
Ezhu Desangalkkum Akale (Malayalam – 2014) And, he played the role of P. Bhaskaran in Ottakkambinaadam, a docu-fiction based on the life of P. Bhaskaran. He has also acted in Minnukettu, Manthrakodi, and Guruvayoor Kesavan Malayalam T.V serials.

Produced
Guruvayoor Kesavan (Malayalam T.V serial)
Bhagavathipuram (Malayalam film), Executive Producer
Laloorinu Parayanullathu (Malayalam documentary film)

Award 
 Sakthan Thampuran Award for producer of Laloorinu Parayanullathu

References

External links 

 
 സീരിയൽ നടനും സിനിമാ നിർമ്മാതാവുമായ ജോസഫ് പാണേങ്ങാടൻ അന്തരിച്ചു
 ജോസഫ് പാണേങ്ങാടൻ അന്തരിച്ചു
 നിര്യാതരായി
 വിയോഗം

Film producers from Kerala
People from Thrissur district
Male actors in Malayalam cinema
1970 births
2017 deaths
Male actors in Malayalam television
Indian male television actors
20th-century Indian male actors
21st-century Indian male actors
Male actors from Kerala